There have been two baronetcies created for persons with the surname Meux, one in the Baronetage of England and one in the Baronetage of the United Kingdom. Both are extinct.

The Meux Baronetcy, of Kingston on the Isle of Wight, was created in the Baronetage of England on 11 December 1641 for John Meux, Member of Parliament for Newtown. The title became extinct on the death of the third Baronet in 1706.

The Meux Baronetcy, of Theobald's Park in the County of Hertford, was created in the Baronetage of the United Kingdom on 30 September 1831 for Henry Meux, head of Meux's Brewery. The second Baronet sat as member of parliament for Hertfordshire. The title became extinct on the death of the third Baronet in 1900. Valerie, Lady Meux, wife of the third Baronet, was a well-known socialite. After her husband's death in 1900 she devised a substantial part of her estates to her friend the Honourable Hedworth Lambton, who after Lady Meux's death in 1911 assumed the surname Meux.

Meux baronets, of Kingston (1641)

Sir John Meux, 1st Baronet (died 1657)
Sir William Meux, 2nd Baronet
Sir William Meux, 3rd Baronet (1683–1706)

Meux baronets, of Theobald's Park (1831)
Sir Henry Meux, 1st Baronet (1770–1841)
Sir Henry Meux, 2nd Baronet (1817–1883)
Sir Henry Bruce Meux, 3rd Baronet (1856–1900)

References

Extinct baronetcies in the Baronetage of England
Extinct baronetcies in the Baronetage of the United Kingdom